Ruslan Nikolayevich Usikov (born 10 April 1975) is a former Russian professional footballer.

References

External links

1975 births
Sportspeople from Bryansk
Living people
Russian footballers
Association football forwards
FC Dynamo Bryansk players
FC Dnepr Mogilev players
FC SKA-Khabarovsk players
FC Fakel Voronezh players
FC Sakhalin Yuzhno-Sakhalinsk players
FC Dynamo Saint Petersburg players
Belarusian Premier League players
Russian expatriate footballers
Expatriate footballers in Belarus
FC MVD Rossii Moscow players
FC Mashuk-KMV Pyatigorsk players